Donald Jerome Lawrence (born June 4, 1937) is the former American football offensive coordinator for the Berlin Thunder in NFL Europa.  He won two World Bowl rings with the Amsterdam Admirals and Frankfurt Galaxy.  As the tight ends coach from 1990 to 1993, he took the Buffalo Bills to four consecutive Super Bowls.  He coached at Notre Dame, Kansas State, Cincinnati, Texas Christian, and Missouri.

Lawrence served as the head football coach at the University of Virginia.  He played college football at Notre Dame.  He played three seasons in the National Football League for the Washington Redskins.

During his 45-year coaching career Coach Lawrence is unique in having coached in four straight Super Bowls (NFL) and four straight World Bowls (NFLE).

Head coaching record

References

1937 births
Living people
American football offensive tackles
Amsterdam Admirals coaches
Buffalo Bills coaches
Cincinnati Bearcats football coaches
Kansas State Wildcats football coaches
Missouri Tigers football coaches
National Football League defensive coordinators
Notre Dame Fighting Irish football coaches
Notre Dame Fighting Irish football players
Omaha Nighthawks coaches
TCU Horned Frogs football coaches
Virginia Cavaliers football coaches
Tampa Bay Buccaneers coaches
Washington Redskins players
Players of American football from Cleveland
Sportspeople from Cleveland